Chiawana High School is a four-year public secondary school in Pasco, Washington, the second traditional high school of Pasco School District #1. Opened in  2009 with 1600 students in grades 9, 10, and 11, CHS graduated its first senior class in 2011. The school colors are blue and silver and the mascot is a riverhawk.

Chiawana's campus features its own athletic facilities, which include a lighted football/soccer field surfaced with FieldTurf, negating the need to use Edgar Brown Memorial Stadium on the other end of town.  The school's gymnasium was used by both Chiawana and Pasco High School for the 2009–2010 school year, as the main gymnasium at Pasco High had an unanticipated roof replacement.

The school's principal is Jaime Morales.

Athletics
Chiawana competes in athletics in WIAA Class 4A in Greater Spokane/Mid-Columbia Conference District VIII, and are members of the Mid-Columbia Conference.

On December 7, 2013, Chiawana won their first state football title in school history.  Led by former Pasco High School football coach Steve Graff, the Riverhawks defeated the Camas High School Papermakers at the Tacoma Dome 27–26 in a comeback victory.  Chiawana, down 13 points with just under one minute remaining in the 4th quarter, scored 14 points in 55 seconds to secure the state title.

References

External links

Pasco School District
 Chiawana Football Official Website

High schools in Franklin County, Washington
Pasco, Washington
Public high schools in Washington (state)
2009 establishments in Washington (state)
Educational institutions established in 2009